James Alfred Hale (1916-1992) was an Australian rugby league footballer who played in the 1940s.

Career

Hale was graded with the South Sydney club in 1940 and switched mid-season to join St. George with whom he played seven seasons between 1941 and 1947. 

He is remembered as the second-row forward in the St George side that was defeated in the 1946 Grand Final by Balmain. At the end of the game, Jim Hale and his ex team-mate Herb Gilbert, Jr. were involved in a brawl when a spectator jumped onto the Sydney Cricket Ground playing area and punched Hale. The incident almost caused a riot amongst rival players and fans and resulted in a number of arrests by police. 

Hale, like his father Percy (1887-1953), was an amateur heavy-weight boxer, and the brawl between him and Gilbert was a huge talking point in the Sydney press for days afterward. A brother, Bill Hale also played for St. George

After retiring from Sydney first grade football, Hale captain coached the Boorowa Rovers Rugby League Club in 1948–1949.

Death
Hale died on 28 December 1992, aged 76.

References

St. George Dragons players
Australian rugby league players
1916 births
1992 deaths
Rugby league second-rows
Rugby league players from Sydney
South Sydney Rabbitohs players